Anna Karsten (born August 30, 1988, in Warsaw) is a travel blogger, traveler, and social media personality. She and her writing and photography have been featured in the New York Times, Forbes, CNN, National Geographic and Travel Channel.

Early life 
Karsten was born as Anna Lysakowska and raised in Warsaw, Poland. She began her career in media as a child TV presenter. When she was 7 she co-hosted a few episodes of popular kids programs on TVP2 and Polsat.

Education 
In 2009 she graduated with distinction and received a Bachelor of Arts from Nicolaus Copernicus University in Toruń. After college, Karsten left to London where she studied at University College London and worked in order to begin her travel and media career.

During her postgraduate studies at Leiden University in 2014, she published her research on the politics of abortion in Mexico (978-3659527661).

Travel career 
Since 2007 Karsten has traveled to over 100 countries and lived on 4 continents. In 2013 she launched her travel blog Anna Everywhere in order to document her journeys around the world. She is also known for self-photography on Instagram.

Anna Karsten has appeared on television and radio in various countries (also as Anna Lysakowska), including TVN24, Azteca, Polskie Radio Program IV and starred in a commercial.

As a speaker, Anna has appeared at Travel Industry Exchange, Traverse and Travelcon.

She has been featured, quoted or written about in dozens of publications including New York Times, The Huffington Post, The Telegraph, Forbes, Matador Network, News.com.au, EasyJet In-flight Magazine, Brussels Airlines In-flight Magazine, Grazia Magazine, Orbitz, TripAdvisor, Gazeta Wyborcza and BuzzFeed.

Anna has also been named the most popular travel blogger from Poland on Instagram by the National Geographic Traveler.

Personal life 
In 2015, he met her now husband Matthew Karsten at a travel blogging conference in Florida. They got married in Las Vegas in 2017.

References

External links 
 AnnaEverywhere.com

1988 births
Living people
Writers from Warsaw
Polish women writers
Leiden University alumni
Polish bloggers
Polish women bloggers